The following is a list of events affecting American television during 1997. Events listed include television show debuts, finales, cancellations, and channel initiations, closures, and rebrandings, as well as information about controversies and disputes.

Events 
{| class="wikitable"
|- "
! Date || Event
|-
| rowspan="4" | January 1
|The television rating system, a system similar to the one used for motion pictures, goes into effect.
|-
|WWOR-TV's WOR EMI Service is officially discontinued, re-uplinked into a local version a month later.
|-
|Dexter's Laboratorys Season 1 finale airs on Cartoon Network.
|-
|The Emergency Alert System comes into effect and replaces the Emergency Broadcast System.
|-
|January 3
|Bryant Gumbel anchors his last Today show on NBC. The following Monday, Matt Lauer takes over alongside Katie Couric until he was fired 20 years later in November 2017.
|-
|January 22
|New World Communications is acquired by Fox. The deal makes 10 New World-owned stations that affiliated with Fox as a result of the 1994 United States broadcast TV realignment network O&O's.
|-
|January 26
|Fox broadcasts its first Super Bowl, making it the last of the big four networks to air a Super Bowl. The Green Bay Packers defeat the New England Patriots 35–21 in a game that gives Fox its highest ratings to date.
|-
|February 1
|The final affiliation switch resulting from the 1994–96 United States broadcast TV realignment takes place when Allbritton Communications (owners of WJLA-TV in Washington, D.C., one of the strongest ABC affiliates in the country) converts WB affiliate WBSG in Brunswick, Georgia into a semi-satellite of new sign-on WJXX in Orange Park, Florida, which assumes the ABC affiliation for the Jacksonville market. Former ABC affiliate WJKS promptly discontinues its news operation and assumes the WB affiliation from WBSG.
|-
|February 9
|On Fox, The Simpsons airs the episode "The Itchy & Scratchy & Poochie Show". With this episode, The Simpsons surpasses The Flintstones as the longest-running primetime animated series in terms of episodes aired.
|-
|February 21
|The old trilon-style puzzle board is used for the last time on Wheel of Fortune after 22 years. Next Monday, February 24, a new digital puzzle board debuts, which allows Vanna White to reveal letters with just a simple touch of a button.
|-
|February 23
|Schindler's List makes its network television debut on NBC. The film is broadcast virtually unedited and is the first telecast to receive a TV-M (now TV-MA) rating under the TV Parental Guidelines that had been established earlier in the year.
|-
|February 26
|Various ABC characters appeared with Las Vegas settings in the shows Grace Under Fire, Coach, The Drew Carey Show, and Ellen.
|-
|March 10
|The pilot episode for Buffy the Vampire Slayer airs on The WB.
|-
|March 17
|Toonami debuts on Cartoon Network.
|-
|March 23
|The 13th annual WrestleMania event airs on pay-per-view. While the event as a whole receives mixed reviews, the submission match between Bret Hart and Stone Cold Steve Austin is highly praised, being called one of the greatest matches in wrestling history, and has been cited by some as the beginning of the Attitude Era.
|-
|April 1
|The cable channel CBS Eye on People (later known as Discovery People) debuted. Also, Jeopardy! host Alex Trebek hosts Wheel of Fortune while Pat Sajak & Vanna White play for charity and Sajak's wife Lesly in charge of the puzzleboard. In turn, Sajak hosts Jeopardy! on this date as well.
|-
|rowspan="2"|April 6
|Disney Channel is revamped with the cable television premiere of Pocahontas. The film would have its network television premiere on ABC one year later.
|-
|Playhouse Disney debuts on Disney Channel.
|-
|April 13
|Extreme Championship Wrestling broadcasts its first ever pay-per-view dubbed "Barely Legal".
|-
|April 30
|The Ellen episode, "The Puppy Episode" is broadcast on ABC, showing for the first time the revelation of a main character as a homosexual.
|-
|May 7
|CBS begins airing the two-part Knots Landing reunion miniseries Knots Landing: Back to the Cul-de-Sac, airing on two non-consecutive nights, on May 7 and May 9.
|-
|May 9
|Bob Saget hosts his final regular episode of America's Funniest Home Videos on ABC, with the other cast members of Full House, minus The Olsen Twins. The $100,000 season finale (his final episode) aired nine days later on May 18th. 
|-
|June 6
|Farrah Fawcett makes a bizarre appearance on CBS's Late Show with David Letterman. Fawcett tells long, rambling stories without a purpose, fails to understand simple questions, and gets easily distracted by things like blinking lights on the set.
|-
|June 21
|The Professional Bowlers Tour ends after 36 years on ABC. CBS assumes the rights to the tour and will televise several events over the next two years.
|-
|rowspan="2"|June 30
|In Seattle, KIRO-TV (CBS) and KSTW (UPN) reverse their 1995 swap.
|-
|The Simpsons begins airing in the Republic of Ireland for the very first time on Network 2 after not airing in the country for a long time since it first started as a series of animated shorts on The Tracey Ullman Show. The series begins its Irish run with "Some Enchanted Evening".
|-
|rowspan="2"|July 8
|KONG-TV, Seattle's independent station goes on the air.
|-
|Fox broadcasts the Major League Baseball All-Star Game from Cleveland, marking the first time that the network would broadcast the midsummer classic.
|-
|July 9
|NewSport ends after four years.
|-
|July 14
|Johnny Bravo premieres on Cartoon Network.
|-
|rowspan="2"|July 15
|A tribute episode of Another World is broadcast on NBC in honor of Victoria Wyndham's 25 years with the program.
|-
|Cow and Chicken and its secondary series I Am Weasel premiere on Cartoon Network. The Cartoon Cartoon programming block also makes its debut on the network.
|-
|July 24
|George Harrison appears on a VH-1 special to promote his friend Ravi Shankar's album Chants of India. This would prove to be Harrison's final television appearance. 
|-
|August 13
|South Park debuts on Comedy Central.
|-
|August 31
|WFFF-TV in Burlington, Vermont signs-on the air, giving the Burlington/Plattsburgh market its first full-time Fox affiliate (prior to this, Fox programming was seen on a secondary basis on CBS affiliate WCAX-TV).
|-
|September 1
|Disney Channel converts from subscription television to a basic cable channel after 14 years.
|-
|September 3
|Jeri Ryan makes her first appearance as Seven of Nine on Star Trek: Voyager.
|-
|September 5
|Joan Lunden makes her final appearance as co-anchor for ABC's Good Morning America, after being on the program since 1980. Lunden would be succeeded by Lisa McRee.
|-
|September 6
|Various networks broadcast the Princess Diana funeral; 2.7 million viewers at home watched this special.
|-
|September 8
|Rugrats receives its very first transmission on Irish television on Network 2 with the series being shown on The Den in Ireland.
|-
|September 8
|KDAF-TV gives up the rights on Fox Kids to KDFI, as KDFW airs news, talk shows, paid/real estate and E/I-complaint programming instead of the block (KDFI also airs said programs, as well as Fox programs, just in case for local news emergencies and sports preemptions).
|-
|September 13
|ABC revamps its Saturday morning cartoon schedule, and adds more new series from parent company Disney to become Disney's One Saturday Morning. This, along with many other programming, was delayed one week from its originally planned debut as a result of the aforementioned Princess Diana funeral. All non-Disney cartoons are discontinued forever. 
|-
|September 14
|The 49th Primetime Emmy Awards presentation was broadcast on CBS.
|-
|September 19
|After several years of being a part of ABC's successful "TGIF" sitcom programming block,  Family Matters and Step by Step switch to CBS to form the basis of the "CBS Block Party", a direct competitor to TGIF. Both series, as well as the Block Party, would be cancelled after one season.
|-
|September 25
|ER produces a live episode for its fourth season premiere.
|-
|September 26
|Jeopardy!'''s 3,000th syndicated episode airs. The categories in the Jeopardy! and Final Jeopardy! rounds from its debut episode in 1984 are used on this episode.
|-
|September 29
|The Superman: The Animated Series episode "Ghost in the Machine" airs on Kids' WB!
|-
|October 1
|PRISM and SportsChannel Philadelphia, cease broadcasting to make way for Comcast SportsNet Philadelphia.
|-
|rowspan="2"|October 25
|Chris Farley guest hosts Saturday Night Live in what would turn out to be his final television appearance before his death on December 18, 1997.
|-
|Under Wraps, the first Disney Channel Original Movie (DCOM) by Disney Channel, is broadcast.
|-
|October 26
|The Game 7 of the World Series is broadcast on NBC. The Florida Marlins defeat the Cleveland Indians, becoming the first baseball wild card team to win the world championship. This was the first World Series that NBC would broadcast in its entirety since 1988. NBC aired only Games 2-3 and the decisive sixth game of the 1995 World Series, while ABC aired the other three and a seventh game had it been necessary.
|-
|October 31
|Detroit regional sports network PASS Sports goes off the air.
|-
|November 2
|A third production of Richard Rodgers and Oscar Hammerstein II's version of Cinderella was aired on ABC. This version, featuring Brandy Norwood and Whitney Houston, was produced by ABC's parent company The Walt Disney Company (which released its own version of the story as an animated movie 1950).
|-
|November 6
|The NBC discussion show Meet the Press celebrates its 50th anniversary.
|-
| rowspan="2"| November 7
|A crossover event featuring Salem in a time ball with Sabrina appeared on all four TGIF shows around that time, Sabrina the Teenage Witch, Boy Meets World, You Wish, and Teen Angel.
|-
|The Space Ghost Coast to Coast episode "Hipster" airs on Cartoon Network.
|-
|November 9
|During a pay-per-view broadcast of the World Wrestling Federation's Survivor Series, then-WWF Champion Bret Hart loses his title to Shawn Michaels. The finish is mired in controversy when WWF chairman Vince McMahon, who had been sitting at ringside, orders Earl Hebner, the assigned referee, to end the match as Michaels is holding Hart in Hart's own finishing maneuver, the Sharpshooter, even though Hart had not submitted. The incident becomes known as the Montreal Screwjob and will mark the final appearance of Hart on WWE television until 2010.
|-
|November 17
|Rick Rude becomes the only person to appear on both USA Network's Raw and TNT's Monday Nitro on the same night. Whereas the Raw that aired that night was pre-recorded six days in advanced, Rude appeared on a live edition of Nitro about an hour earlier.   
|-
|November 23
|King of the Hill starts being screened in Australia for the first time on Seven Network.
|-
|November 29
|The Emergency Broadcast System is replaced by the Emergency Alert System and it continues to this day.
|-
|December 8
|WVIT becomes an NBC O&O for the second time, and Paramount Stations Group had purchased WLWC and WWHO, dropping off newscasts, although Paramount had to run these two as a WB affiliate until 2000, while getting UPN to secondary status.
|-
|December 15
|World Wrestling Federation chairman Vince McMahon announces the introduction of the Attitude Era (a term used by WWF for its adult-oriented programming) on Raw Is War, during a segment entitled "The Cure for the Common Show". The WWF Attitude's scratch logo also makes its on-screen debut within the episode, replacing the New Generation's block logo.
|-
|December 23
|Trio, a channel devoted to CBC programs, debuts for United States viewers.
|-
|December 24
|TNT/TBS broadcasts "24 Hours of A Christmas Story", consisting of 12 consecutive airings of the 1983 film from the evening of Christmas Eve to the evening of Christmas Day. 
|}

Programs

Debuts

Returning this year

Ending this year

Made-for-TV movies

Miniseries

Shows changing networks

Entering syndication  this year
{|class="wikitable"
|-
! Show || Seasons || In Production || Source
|-
|Boy Meets World||4||rowspan="1"|Yes||
|-
|Due South||3||rowspan="1"|Yes||
|-
|Frasier||4|| rowspan="1" 1 |Yes||
|-
|Grace Under Fire||4|| rowspan="1" 1 |Yes||
|-
|Living Single||4|| rowspan="1" 1 |Yes||
|-
|NYPD Blue||4|| rowspan="1" 1 |Yes||
|-
|Walker, Texas Ranger||5|| rowspan="1" 1 |Yes||
|-
|The X-Files||4|| rowspan="1" 1 |Yes||
|}

Television stations

Station launches

Stations changing network affiliation

Births

Deaths

Television Debuts
James Gandolfini – Gun
Natasha Henstridge – The Outer Limits
Nick Offerman – ER
Rebecca Romijn – Friends
Octavia Spencer – 413 Hope St.
Jason Sudeikis – Alien Avengers II
Wanda Sykes – The Chris Rock Show
Paz Vega – Menudo es mi padre
Goran Visnjic – Olujne tisine 1895-1995
Shea Whigham – Ghost Stories
Rainn Wilson – One Life to Live

References

External links
List of 1997 American television series at IMDb

 
1990s in American television